Matthieu Madelaine (born 24 November 1983) is a French freestyle swimmer who competed in the 2008 Summer Olympics.

References

1983 births
Living people
French male freestyle swimmers
Olympic swimmers of France
Swimmers at the 2008 Summer Olympics
Mediterranean Games bronze medalists for France
Mediterranean Games medalists in swimming
Swimmers at the 2005 Mediterranean Games
Universiade medalists in swimming
Universiade gold medalists for France
Sportspeople from Maine-et-Loire
Medalists at the 2005 Summer Universiade
20th-century French people
21st-century French people